Jerry McKee Adams, FAA, FRS, FAHMS, FRSV (born 17 June 1940) is an Australian-American molecular biologist whose research into the genetics of haemopoietic differentiation and malignancy, led him and his wife, Professor Suzanne Cory, to be the first two scientists to pioneer gene cloning techniques in Australia, and to successfully clone mammalian genes.

Adams currently shares (with Andreas Strasser) the position of Joint-Head of the Molecular Genetics of Cancer Division at The Walter and Eliza Hall Institute of Medical Research (WEHI) in Melbourne (Australia). Their research, following that by Susumu Tonegawa, also led to the discovery that antibody genes encode as bits and pieces, that can recombine in a myriad of ways to help fight infection; they also confirmed earlier work by Shen-Ong & Cole, Leder, Hood, Croce, and Hayward that genetic mutation leads to Burkitt's lymphoma, a malignancy of antibody-producing cells, called "B lymphocytes".

It was in Adams' lab that his PhD student, David Vaux, made the connection between apoptosis (programmed cell death) and cancer, while studying the bcl-2 gene in follicular lymphoma, the most common human lymphoma.

Career
He studied for his B.Sc at Emory University in Atlanta, Georgia. After completing his PhD at the Harvard University, Adams was awarded the Helen Hay Whitney Fellowship to pursue post-doctoral training. He spent a year working under  Professor James Watson at the Medical Research Council  Laboratory of Molecular Biology in Cambridge, England, during which he met Suzanne Cory, and started their long-term collaboration. They moved to the Institut de Biologie Moléculaire, at the University of Geneva, where they worked under Professor A. Tissiéres.  Adams and Cory subsequently moved to Australia, and began working at WEHI where they established the Institute's first molecular genetics laboratory.

Their research first looked into how lymphocytes could produce so many different antibodies, providing insights into the constant and variable segments of antibodies, and how they are rearranged and deleted. Next, Adams and his team moved into the study of the genetics of cancer.

In 2007, Adams was appointed member of the Medical Research Advisory Committee at the Australian Cancer Research Foundation (ACRF). He is part of a group of leading scientists who assess applications for grants for medical research received by the ACRF.

He was elected a Fellow of the Royal Society in 1992  and of the Royal Society of Victoria (FRSV) in 1997. In 2014 he was awarded the Macfarlane Burnet Medal and Lecture by the Australian Academy of Science. He was elected a Fellow of the Australian Academy of Health and Medical Sciences in 2021.

Private life
He is married to his fellow scientist and collaborator Suzanne Cory; they have 2 children.

References

External links
 Adams JM Author Profile Page on Pubget
 MRAC Biography courtesy of Australian Cancer Research Foundation

Bibliography

1940 births
Living people
21st-century American biologists
Australian molecular biologists
Place of birth missing (living people)
Australian Fellows of the Royal Society
Fellows of the Australian Academy of Science
WEHI alumni
Fellows of the AACR Academy
Australian emigrants to the United States
Australian expatriates in the United Kingdom
Fellows of the Australian Academy of Health and Medical Sciences
Emory University alumni
Harvard University alumni